Sir George Moyers (11 May 1836 – 4 November 1916) was an Anglo-Irish architect, engineer and politician. 

Moyers was the son of William Moyers. He was educated at Bellevue House, Bristol and Trinity College Dublin, graduating in 1856. He did a five-year architectural apprenticeship with his brother-in-law, Edward Henry Carson (father of Edward Carson), and worked in London for the engineers George Legg and William Dempsey. By 1863, he had taken over his father's building contractor business in South Richmond Street, Dublin. In 1891 he opened a new architecture and civil engineering business with his son, Lambert Moyers, in Foster Place.

From 1875 he was a Justice of the Peace for Dublin and was later made a Deputy Lieutenant for the city. He was elected an alderman for the Southside, Dublin in 1880 and was elected Lord Mayor of Dublin as a Conservative in 1881. He was knighted in the 1887 Golden Jubilee Honours.

References

1836 births
1916 deaths
19th-century Anglo-Irish people
20th-century Anglo-Irish people
Alumni of Trinity College Dublin
Architects from Dublin (city)
Conservative Party (UK) politicians
Deputy Lieutenants of Dublin (city)
Irish civil engineers
Irish justices of the peace
Knights Bachelor
Lord Mayors of Dublin